The Deputy Chief Justice of South Africa is a judge in the Constitutional Court of South Africa and the second-highest judicial post in the Republic of South Africa, after the Chief Justice. The post, originally called "Deputy President of the Constitutional Court", was created in September 1995 by the Constitution of the Republic of South Africa Second Amendment Act, 1995, which was an amendment to the Interim Constitution. The position was retained by the final Constitution which came into force in February 1997. In November 2001 the Sixth Amendment of the Constitution of South Africa restructured the judiciary, and the post was renamed to "Deputy Chief Justice".

The first Deputy President of the Constitutional Court was Ismail Mahomed. In 1997 he became Chief Justice, and was replaced by Pius Langa, who continued as Deputy Chief Justice after 2001. Justice Langa was elevated to Chief Justice in 2005, and succeeded by  Dikgang Moseneke. Moseneke retired on 20 May 2016.

List of deputy chief justices
Ismail Mahomed (1995 – 1997; as Deputy President of the Constitutional Court)
Pius Langa (2001 – 2005)
Dikgang Moseneke (2005 – 2016)
Bess Nkabinde (2016 – 2017)
Raymond Zondo (June 2017 - April 2022)
Mandisa Maya (1 September 2022-)

References

External links
Constitutional Court of South Africa

Judiciary of South Africa
Constitutional Court of South Africa